Paul Chung (5 April 1959 – 1 September 1989) was a Hong Kong actor, MC (Master of Ceremonies) and a DJ in the early 1980s. He committed suicide on 1 September 1989.

Biography 
Paul Chung was originally a host in Commercial Radio and was part of a 13 member DJ group, including Brenda Lo , Winnie Yu and Suzie Wong (TV host), so-called "6 pair-half". In 1981, he had a dispute with Commercial radio, and joined Asia Television (ATV/RTV) where he was cast in several TV dramas. He became popular when he costarred with Danny Chan and Leslie Cheung in two films.

Chung joined TVB in 1985, hosting a number of TV shows such as Miss Hong Kong Pageant and Enjoy Yourself Tonight (EYT). He was praised by media as "the best host of Miss Hong Kong".

He committed suicide on 1 September 1989 in his home of Shatin City One. It was reported that he had amassed large gambling debts prior to his death.

Filmography

Movies

Drama (RTV / ATV)

References 

1959 births
1989 deaths
Hong Kong male film actors
Hong Kong radio presenters
Hong Kong television presenters
Suicides by jumping in Hong Kong
20th-century Hong Kong male actors
1989 suicides